Harbor Air may refer to one of the following regional airlines:
Harbour Air Seaplanes, from British Columbia, Canada (founded in 1982)
Bar Harbor Airlines, from Maine, USA (1971–1991)
Harbor Airlines, from Washington, USA (1971–2001)